Samyaza, also Shemhazai, Azza, Uzza, or Ouza, is a fallen angel of apocryphal Abrahamic traditions and Manichaeism who ranked in the heavenly hierarchy as the leader of the Watchers.

Etymology
The name "Shemyaza(z)" means "the (or my) name has seen," "he sees the name," or "I have seen." It is also spelled "Samyaza", "Shemhazai", "Samiaza(z)", "Semiaza", "Shamazya", "Shemyazaz", "Shemihazah", "Shemyaza", "Sêmîazâz", "Semjâzâ", "Samjâzâ", "Šemihaza", and "Semyaza".

The scholars lean towards the Semitic etymology of this appellation which contains the letters shin (ש) and mem (מ), thus suggesting the derivation from either “name” (Heb. שם, shem) or “heavens” (Heb. שמים, shamaym). Moshe Idel proposed that Samyaza is the one who “gazes at heavens” or “gazes from heavens”. This interpretation goes well with the motif of the heavenly Watchers, i.e., the angels supervising humans on earth.

In colloquial Aramaic of the Christians of the Middle East, it has become the common name for a television.

Book of Enoch
In the Book of Enoch, one of the apocryphal writings, Samyaza is portrayed as the leader of a band of angels called "sons of God" or "Watchers" (grigori in Greek). These Watchers became consumed with lust for mortal women and entered into machinations against heaven in order to consummate their  desires.

When the rebel angels first meet upon Mount Hermon to organize their secret society of 200 members, Samyaza, as their recognized chieftain, initially doubts the initiates' resolve to forswear heaven. This they had planned to achieve through dark alliances and clandestine oaths sworn under penalty of death, thereby binding themselves to that treachery whereby they would use their heaven-acquired knowledge to create a counterfeit religion on earth to satisfy their lusts and carnal desires:

Having thus persuaded his fellow Watchers to join him in his schemes to fornicate with women, Samyaza led his angelic brethren in their seduction of the human females for whom they yearned. The hybrid offspring born from this unnatural mating between heavenly and earthly beings were the Nephilim - a plural noun rendered as 'giants' in the King James translation of the Book of Genesis. Together, the Watchers and their demigod children dominated, exploited and at times even  murdered the lesser folk who lacked their angelic pedigree. Their reign began in the days of the righteous patriarch Jared, the father of the prophet Enoch and, as time passed,  their debauchery sank to ever greater depths: "And there was great impiety and much fornication, and they went astray and all their ways became corrupt" (1 En 8:1-2). This wickedness caused Enoch to have a sleep-vision or prophetic dream, known as the 'Animal Apocalypse', which relates how

In the Book of Giants, found at Qumran, Samyaza, through this forbidden action, fathers two half-breed giant sons, Ohya and Hahyah.

The Watchers shared with humankind various forbidden arts, sciences, and celestial "secrets" or "mysteries" of the true heavenly gnosis or knowledge — especially that Wisdom possessed by Azazel, who taught them also the secrets of magic, of war (including metallurgy and weaponry) and of seductive ornamentation (including jewelry and cosmetics) — all of which ultimately brought down the wrath of Heaven upon the rebel angels and their spawn.

God commanded the angel Gabriel to cause the Watchers and giants to wage civil war: 

Finally, the judgement of the Watcher-associates of Samyaza is described.

Once the archangels and the host of the righteous had punished the Watchers and giants, God poured forth, after several generations, the Great Flood of Noah to wipe out the lingering remnants of the corrupted races of Earth. Through the diluvial judgment, God swept away the last of the lawlessness that had been unleashed by the forbidden knowledge of the Watchers, re-establishing His covenant with Noah and his sons and restoring harmony and fertility to the Earth.

Book of Giants
In The Book of Giants, Shemyaza (or Šahmīzād in the Manichaean version) begets two sons, who together battle Leviathan. However, they are not portrayed as heroic, but as boasting about their own victory; a symbol of royal failure to keep one's power in this world. After the defeat of the Leviathan, Shemyaza and his offspring are slain by the four punishing angels.

Babylonian Talmud 
The Babylonian Talmud contains a singular mention of the name Samyaza (spelled שמחזאי in the Vilna edition with some lesser variations in the manuscripts) in Niddah 61a. Accordingly:

The text does not elucidate the identity of Samyaza who appears nowhere else in the corpus, but clearly portrays him as the grandfather of Og, the king of Bashan and the last of Rephaim known for his gigantic height and strength (Deuteronomy 3:11). As such this can be taken as a reference to the myth of the fallen angels and the motif of their gigantic progeny transmitted in apocrypha and pseudepigrapha.

Other traditions
In legend, Azza (another name for Samyaza) is the seraph tempted by the maiden Ishtar to reveal to her the Explicit Name of God. In Solomonic lore, the story is that Azza was the angel who revealed to the Jewish king the heavenly arcana, thus making Solomon the wisest man on earth. Of the two groups of angels headed by Metatron, one of the groups, the angels of justice, were under the rulership of Azza, who at this time had not yet fallen.

Azza, according to the rabbinic tradition, is suspended between Heaven and Earth along with Azazel as punishment for having had carnal knowledge of mortal women. He is said to be constantly falling, with one eye shut and the other open, to see his plight and suffer the more. It is said that he now hangs, head down, and is the constellation of Orion.

Uzza (said to be another name for Samyaza) is the tutelary angel of the Egyptians.

Before the fall, Ouza (said to be another name for Samyaza) was of the rank of Seraphim.

See also 
 
 List of angels in theology
 
 
 Sexuality in Christian demonology

References

Works cited

Watchers (angels)
Individual angels
Angels in Judaism
Manichaeism